Ericson Yachts, Inc. was a pioneering builder of fiberglass yachts.  Ericson is now out of business, but its designs have been reproduced periodically by other manufacturers.

History
Ericson Yachts was founded by Handy and Jenkins in about 1963. They began with molds bought from a defunct builder as well as from an enterprising dump operator. After a year or two
of operation, they filed for chapter 11 bankruptcy and were subsequently purchased by Mark Pitman and Del Walton in 1965. During this period yacht designer Bruce King's first production designs were
built. They were the E-30, E-32 Scorpion, E-41, E-35-2, and the E-23. In 1968 Ericson was sold to Pacific American Industries, Roland Mayotte Chairman. Mark Pitman stayed on as president, and Del
Walton stayed on as VP of sales. The new facility on Deere Ave in Irvine was built by PAI. During this period the E-32-2, E-29, E-39, E-27, and E-46 were built.  1.64 In 1971 Ericson was sold to CML, Charles Leighton Chairman. Mark Pitman left, and Del Walton became president. During this period the E-25, E-37, E-23-2, E-36C, Madcap (custom 40) (Ericson 41 1967-1971 1-50 Hauls 41'Ocean Racer) E-31C/Independence 31,E-34-R/E-34-T, E-30-2/30+ were produced. In 1978 Red Cavaney replaced Del Walton as president. The E-25+/26, E-38/E-381/E-38-200 were produced. In 1981 Eugene Kohlmann replaced Red Caveney as
president. The E-35-3/E-34, E-32-3, and the E-28 were produced. In 1985 Ericson was sold by CML to Acquico, Eugene Kohlmann president. In 1990 Ericson ceased operations and liquidated assets. Some of the molds
the E-26, E-28, E-32, E-34, E-38, and E-43 (never built) were bought by Pacific Seacraft, a subsidiary of Singmarine Corp.

Pacific Seacraft itself was purchased by Southern Californian businessman Jeffrey Emery in September 1998.

Hull #1, E-32 Scorpion resides in Oregon, built in 1965, and is possibly the first production Ericson.

Models

References

Sources
 Hornor, Jack. "Ericson 38 - 2nd Time Around," Boat/US Magazine,  May, 2002.
 "New Boat Review," Practical Sailor, 24(2), January 15, 1998.
 Southern California PHRF (Rating Board)
 Ericson Owner's History Webpage
 Ericson Discovers The Keys to Success
 Kretcschmer, John, Used Boat Notebook, Sheridan House, 2002 pages 101 -105
 Spurr, Daniel, Heart of Glass, McGraw Hill, 2000 pages 144, 239 - 240, 292 & 352.
 Jones, Gregory, The American Sailboat, MBI Publishing Co., 2002,  pgs 168 - 169
 Editors of Practical Sailor, Practical Boat Buying, Belvoir Books, 2003  pg 191

External links

 www.EricsonYachts.org
 Boat/US Ericson 35 Review
 Boat/US Ericson 38 Review
 What is an Ericson 30?

Ericson Yachts